Nguyễn Hai Long (born 27 August 2000) is a Vietnamese professional footballer who plays as a central midfielder for V.League 1 club Hà Nội.

Club career
Born in Quảng Ninh in a family that did not follow football, Nguyễn Hai Long had always shown a passion for football from a young age and soon trained at Viettel Football Center. He and Viettel won the runner-up of the U-13 tournament and the National U-15 champion before returning to train for Than Quang Ninh's youth team in 2015.

In 2020, he officially competed in the V.League 1 in the shirt of Than Quang Ninh with the shirt number 88 .

2020
He was ranked as the main stone by coach Phan Thanh Hùng during his trip to Viettel in the 4th round of the V-League 2020. He immediately left a big mark thanks to his confidence, bravery and ability to control. controlled the ball well on the day coach Park Hang-seo attended. The poise continued to be shown by him in the match Than Quang Ninh as a guest against Hai Phong. He received many compliments from the fans for his skillful and convincing performance, helping the "mine team" win against the opponent in the 5th round of the V-League 2020.

2021
In October 2021, after the news that Than Quang Ninh was in danger of shutting down, the Hanoi club quickly recruited him with a 5-year contract.

International career
In 2020, he was called up by coach Park Hang-seo to Vietnam U22. Although this is only a small gathering for the Korean strategist to check his expertise, it is also a worthy achievement for the efforts of this young midfielder.

Honours
Hà Nội
V.League 1: 2022
Vietnam U23
Southeast Asian Games: 2021

References

External links
 

2000 births
Living people
Vietnamese footballers
Vietnam international footballers
Association football forwards
V.League 1 players
People from Quảng Ninh province
Competitors at the 2021 Southeast Asian Games
Southeast Asian Games competitors for Vietnam